Graianrhyd, also spelt Graeanrhyd, is a small, scattered village in the community of Llanarmon-yn-Iâl, Denbighshire, Wales, lying in hilly limestone country around   to the east of Llanarmon-yn-Iâl village, and just to the south of Eryrys.

The name is likely derived from the Welsh graean, "gravel", and rhyd, "ford": there is still a ford across the River Terrig on a minor road east of the village. There are several limestone and silicate quarries in the immediate area, which is on the borders of the Clwydian Range and Dee Valley Area of Outstanding Natural Beauty; the Clwydian Way footpath runs nearby. The area is predominantly agricultural with a landscape of woods and pastureland.

There was no church in the village, though there was a nonconformist (Congregationalist) chapel, built in 1843 and rebuilt in 1859 in a simple vernacular style. The chapel is now closed, though in 1905 it was recorded as having a congregation of 192. The former Graianrhyd primary school ceased to operate in 2002, after its intake for the year fell to only 3 pupils, though the village has retained its pub, the Rose & Crown.

References

Villages in Denbighshire
Llanarmon-yn-Iâl